Roger Berbig (born 6 November 1954 in Zürich, Switzerland) is a retired football goalkeeper.

During his club career, Berbig played solely for Grasshoppers Zürich where he won 4 Swiss championships and reached the semi finals of the UEFA Cup in 1977/78. He was club captain between 1982–84 and lead the team to 3 successive championship titles.

He also played for the Switzerland national football team.

External links 

 
 

1954 births
Living people
Swiss men's footballers
Switzerland international footballers
Association football goalkeepers
Grasshopper Club Zürich players
Footballers from Zürich